Pablo Andrés Robles Hatadi (born March 21, 1968) is a Mexican football manager and former player.

References

External links

Footballers from Mexico City
Mexican footballers
1968 births
Living people
Association football defenders
Atlante F.C. footballers
Querétaro F.C. footballers
Mexican football managers